Chavismo (from ), also known in English as Chavism or Chavezism, is a left-wing populism political ideology based on the ideas, programs and government style associated with the Venezuelan President between 1999 and 2013 Hugo Chávez that combines elements of democratic socialism, socialist patriotism, Bolivarianism, and Latin American integration. Supporters of Hugo Chávez and Chavismo are known as Chavistas.

Policies

Several political parties in Venezuela support Chavismo. The main party, founded by Chávez, is the United Socialist Party of Venezuela, usually referred to by the four letters PSUV). Other parties and movements supporting Chavismo include Fatherland for All (Spanish: Patria Para Todos or PPT) and Tupamaros.

Broadly, Chavismo policies include nationalization, social welfare programs and opposition to neoliberalism (particularly the policies of the International Monetary Fund and the World Bank). According to Chávez, Venezuelan socialism accepts private property, but seeks to promote social ownership as well.

Support

According to political scientist John Magdaleno, the proportion of Venezuelans who define themselves as Chavistas declined from 44% to around 22% between October 2012 and December 2014, after the death of Hugo Chávez and the deterioration of the economy during Nicolás Maduro's tenure. In February 2014, a poll conducted by International Consulting Services, an organization created by Dr. Juan Vicente Scorza, a sociologist and anthropologist for the National Experimental University of the Armed Forces, found that 62% of Venezuelans consider themselves supporters or followers of the ideals of Chávez.

By 2016, many Chavistas became disenchanted with the Bolivarian government under Maduro and sought to emigrate from Venezuela to a more stable country.

Criticism

Despite its claim to socialist rhetoric, Chavismo has been frequently described as being state capitalist by critics. In a 2017 interview, after being asked if he would take Venezuela's failing economy as an admission that socialism "wrecked people's lives", philosopher Noam Chomsky said: "I never described Chavez's state capitalist government as 'socialist' or even hinted at such an absurdity. It was quite remote from socialism. Private capitalism remained ... Capitalists were free to undermine the economy in all sorts of ways, like massive export of capital." Critics also frequently point towards Venezuela's large private sector. In 2009, roughly 70% of Venezuela's gross domestic product was created by the private sector.

Academic views on Chavismo
Academic research produced about Chavismo shows a considerable consensus when acknowledging its early shift to the left and its strong populist component. However, besides these two points there is significant disagreement in the literature. According to Kirk A. Hawkins, scholars are generally divided into two camps: a liberal democratic one that sees Chavismo as an instance of democratic backsliding and a radical democratic one that upholds Chavismo as the fulfillment of its aspirations for democracy. Hawkins argues that the most important division between these two groups is neither methodological nor theoretical, but ideological. It is a division over basic normative views of democracy: liberalism versus radicalism (page 312).

Liberal democracy approach
Scholars in this camp adhered to a classical liberal ideology that valued procedural democracy (competitive elections, widespread participation defined primarily in terms of voting and civil liberties) as the political means best suited to achieving human welfare. Many of these scholars had a liberal vision of economics, although some were moderate social democrats who were critical of neoliberalism. Together, they saw Chavismo in a mostly negative light as a case of democratic backsliding or even competitive authoritarianism or electoral authoritarian regime. The most relevant aspects of the liberal critique of Chavismo are the following:
Failure to ensure free and fair elections due to fraud or frequent changes of electoral rules. The government also violates principles of electoral freedom, especially during and after the 2004 presidential recall election. Many of these violations would be possible due to bias within the National Electoral Council (page 314).
Violation of civil liberties. A number of civil liberties saw significant reverses under the Chávez government, including the right of association and freedom of expression. Some of the most significant setbacks are in media freedom, where Chavism has used several means to constrain the operation of commercial media (page 315).
Infringement of separation of powers. Liberal scholars argue that Chavismo eliminates the separation of powers between the branches of government by manipulating to produce a super majority to the supreme court. Besides, by 2006, the government had fired hundreds of judges in lower courts as well and threatened to remove and prosecute any judge who dared to rule against the government (page 316).
Political discrimination and exclusion of opposition parties. Under Chavista governments, state resources are used to favor the incumbent, the opposition parties lack access to media, and legal institutions are captured by the incumbent. Besides, many sources cited by liberal scholars suggest that the government's participatory initiatives are used as campaign infrastructure (page 316).
Undermining the rule of law. Liberal critics present three majors examples to sustain that: (i) the politicization of the judiciary and the bureaucracy violated due process and facilitated the growth of corruption; (ii) the state's willingness to intervene in and expropriate private industry, often through dubious legal means, served to weaken property rights; (iii) and levels of violent crime skyrocketed, this is a test (page 316).

Radical democracy approach
Scholars in this camp generally adhered to a classical socialist ideology that mistrusted market institutions in either the state or the economy. They saw procedural democracy as insufficient to ensure political inclusion (although they still accepted the importance of liberal democratic institutions) and emphasized participatory forms of democracy and collective worker ownership in the economy. They tended toward descriptions of the movement that celebrated its participatory features or analyzed its potential weaknesses for accomplishing its revolutionary goals. Most of these scholars supported Chavismo and helped constitute the civilian wing of the movement. Radical scholars argue that democracy can only become effective if it is deepened—and they feel that Chavismo is doing this deepening, which requires not only the greater inclusion of poor and excluded sectors in decision making but their remaking into a new "popular" identity that facilitates their autonomy and dignity. For some of these scholars, deepening also means the adoption of a socialist economy and some argue it requires taking power through charismatic leadership, which would have enough political support to conduct structural reforms (pages 313–319).

Relationship with Trotskyism 
In 2010, Hugo Chávez proclaimed support for the ideas of Marxist Leon Trotsky, saying "When I called him (former Minister of Labour, José Ramón Rivero)" Chávez explained, "he said to me: 'President I want to tell you something before someone else tells you ... I am a Trotskyist', and I said, 'well, what is the problem? I am also a Trotskyist! I follow Trotsky's line, that of permanent revolution', and then cited Marx and Lenin".

Chavismo and the media
In The Weekly Standard in 2005, Thor Halvorssen Mendoza described the core of Chavismo as a "far-reaching foreign policy that aims to establish a loosely aligned federation of revolutionary republics as a resistance bloc in the Americas".

In 2006, Noam Chomsky expressed a certain degree of support for Chávez and his policies, saying that he was "quite interested" by his policies and that he regarded "many of them" as "quite constructive", noting that most importantly Chávez seemed to enjoy overwhelming support from his people after "six closely supervised elections".

According to an article in The New York Sun, Chavismo was rejected in elections around 2006 in Peru, Colombia and Mexico. El Universal reported that former Brazilian President Luiz Inácio Lula da Silva kept distance from Chavismo, saying that Brazil is not Venezuela and has traditional institutions. Still, Lula supported Chávez in the Venezuelan presidential election of 2012.

The Nation noted on its editorial pages the following: Chavismo is not an adequate description of the social movement that makes up Chávez's political base, since many organizations predate his rise to political power, and their leaders and cadre have a sophisticated understanding of their relationship with Chávez. Over the last couple of years, a number of social scientists have done field work in urban barrios, and their findings confirm that this synergy between the central government and participatory local organizations has expanded, not restricted, debate and that democracy is thriving in Venezuela.

Chavismo has ripped open the straitjacket of post–Cold War Latin American discourse, particularly the taboo against government regulation of the economy and economic redistribution. Public policy, including economic policy, is now open to discussion and, importantly, popular influence. This is in sharp contrast to Costa Rica, where a few months ago its Supreme Court, with the support of its executive branch, prohibited public universities from not just opposing but even debating the Central American Free Trade Agreement, which soon won a national referendum by a razor-thin margin.

In February 2014, about a year following Hugo Chávez's death, The Atlantic stated the following: Hugo Chávez based his popularity on his extraordinary charisma, much discretionary money, and a key and well-tested political message: denouncing the past and promising a better future for all. The country's widespread student protests now symbolize the demise of this message. Venezuelans younger than 30 years of age (the majority of the population) have not known any government other than that of Chávez or Maduro. For them, "Chavismo" is the past. As for the promises of a better future: The results are in. The catastrophic consequences of Chávez's 21st-century socialism are impossible to mask any longer and the government has run out of excuses. Blaming the CIA, the "fascist opposition", or "dark international forces", as Maduro and his allies customarily do, has become fodder for parodies flooding YouTube. The concrete effects of 15 years of Chavismo are all too visible in empty shelves and overflowing morgues.

In 2015, when The Economist was commenting about corruption in Latin America, it said the following: The viceroys of the colonial era set the pattern. They centralised power and bought the loyalty of local interest groups. [...] Caudillos, dictators and elected presidents continued the tradition of personalising power. Venezuela's Chavismo and the Kirchnerismo of Ms Fernández are among today's manifestations.

See also
Bolivarianism
Great Patriotic Pole
Hugo Chávez's cult of personality
List of political parties in Venezuela
Socialism of the 21st century
Solidarity economy
Welfare capitalism

References

Bibliography

https://www.as-coa.org/articles/deconstructing-chavismo-myth-and-reality
https://www.transparency.org/en/press/chavismo-inc-investigation-reveals-the-workings-of-bolivarian-capitalism-around-the-world
https://www.cubazuela.com/the-rise-and-fall-of-chavismo-in-venezuela/

Bolivarian Revolution
Crisis in Venezuela
Eponymous political ideologies
Far-left politics in Venezuela
Hugo Chávez
Left-wing ideologies
Left-wing nationalism
Left-wing populism in South America
Pan-Americanism
Patriotism
Politics of Venezuela
Populism
Socialism in Venezuela
Socialism of the 21st century
Types of socialism
Society of Venezuela
Third-Worldism
Trotskyism